Part of the troff suite of Unix document layout tools, tbl is a preprocessor that formats tables in preparation for processing with troff/nroff.

Overview
Mike Lesk is the original author of tbl. Like the main troff program, it uses command lines interspersed with data to be printed. Because of the nature of tabular data having rows and columns, tbl commands also intraline delimiters for fields and to indicate where to draw lines.

First a line starting with .TS, followed by full table options such as center to center the table on a line or box to draw a box around it (boxes in tbl are drawn with overlapping hyphens and underscores; there were no line drawing commands at the time of creation. Disjoint edges can be observed upon close inspection).
Succeeding lines set up the formatting of each cell in the table with one character flags, such as c to center data in its cell, hyphens to draw horizontal rules, vertical bars to draw vertical rules, and carets to span cells vertically.

The last formatting ends a period indicate cell data follows. The data comes next, one line per row, with tabs (by default) separating cells. Finally a line containing just .TE ends the table.

This is just a summary of tbl syntax, which can vary in small details from implementation to implementation. GNU troff (groff), Heirloom troff, and mandoc contain tbl implementations.

See also
 troff
 groff (software)
 mandoc

References

External links
L.L.Cherry, M.E.Lesk. Tbl - A Program to Format Tables
Man page for tbl(1)

tbl